Campiglossa angustipennis is a species of tephritid or fruit flies in the genus Campiglossa of the family Tephritidae.

Distribution
The species is found in French Polynesia.

References

Tephritinae
Insects described in 1938